The year 1929 in television involved some significant events.
Below is a list of television-related events during 1929.



Global television events

Births

References